Antonio Sabàto Sr. (2 April 1943 – 10 January 2021) was an Italian-American film and television actor noted for extensive work in the Italian exploitation genre. He was the father of model and actor Antonio Sabàto Jr. and Simmone Sabàto. Among Sabàto's starring roles were parts in the Spaghetti Western films One Dollar Too Many and Due volte Giuda.

Personal life 
Sabàto was previously married to Yvonne, who was born in Prague (then part of Czechoslovakia) and the daughter of a Holocaust survivor. She is of half Czech and half Jewish descent. They had two children together, a son, Antonio, and a daughter, Simonne. They divorced sometime before 1997, when she remarried to California-based businessman George F. Kabouchy. In 1985, he and his family immigrated to the United States, settling in California.

He died from complications of COVID-19 at a hospice in Hemet, California, on 10 January 2021, at age 77.

Selected filmography 

 Lo scandalo (1966) - Mauro
 Grand Prix (1966) - Nino Barlini
 Hate for Hate (1967, a.k.a. Odio per odio ) - Miguel
 Shoot Twice (1968, Due volte Giuda) - Luke Barrett
 Beyond the Law (1968, Al di là della legge) - Ben Novack
 One Dollar Too Many (1968, I tre che sconvolsero il West / Vado, vedo e sparo) - Moses Lang
 Barbarella (1968) - Jean-Paul (uncredited)
 The Lady of Monza (1969, a.k.a. La monaca di Monza) - Giampaolo Osio
 Diary of a Telephone Operator (1969, Certo, certissimo, anzi... probabile) - Carmelo
 Lovemaker (1969) - Giorgio Marelli
 Mafia Connection (1970, E venne il giorno dei limoni neri) - Rosario Inzulìa
 The Man with Icy Eyes (1971, a.k.a. L'uomo dagli occhi di ghiaccio) - Eddie Mills
 When Men Carried Clubs and Women Played Ding-Dong (1971) - Ari
 L'occhio del ragno (1971) - Paul Valéry / Frank Vogel
 Seven Blood-Stained Orchids (1972) - Mario
 I senza Dio (1972) - Roy, detto 'El Santo'
 Crime Boss (1972) - Antonio Mancuso
 Tutti fratelli nel West... per parte di padre (1972) - Jonathan 'Jeepo' Poe
 Gang War in Milan (1973) - Salvatore "Toto" Cangemi
 Questa volta ti faccio ricco! (1974) - Joe Esposito
 The Last Desperate Hours (1974, a.k.a. Milano: il clan dei calabresi) - Paolo Mancuso
 El clan de los Nazarenos (1975) - Jorge
 Calling All Police Cars (1975) - Commissario Fernando Solmi
 Crimebusters (1976) - Comm. Paolo Tosi
 Terror in Rome (1976) - Inspector De Gregori
 Four Billion in Four Minutes (1976) - Raffaele
 Return of the 38 Gang (1977) - Marshall Tinto Baragli
 Canne mozze (1977) - Giovanni Molet
 War of the Robots (1978) - Captain John Boyd
 The New Godfathers (1979) - Don Michele Vizzini
 Napoli... la camorra sfida, la città risponde (1979) - Vito
 La tua vita per mio figlio (1980) - Antonio Esposito
 Escape from the Bronx (1983) - Dablone / Toblerone
 Thunder Warrior (1983) - Thomas
 Zampognaro innamorato (1983) - Marito di Angela
 Tuareg: The Desert Warrior (1984, a.k.a. Tuareg – Il guerriero del deserto) - The Captain
 Thunder Squad (1985) - Martin Cuomo
 Bye Bye Vietnam (1988) - Razor
 High Voltage (1997) - Carlo
 The Bold and the Beautiful (2006, TV Series) – Aldo Damiano (final appearance)

References

External links

1943 births
2021 deaths
People from Montelepre
Actors from the Province of Palermo
Italian male film actors
Italian male television actors
Italian emigrants to the United States
Male Spaghetti Western actors
Deaths from the COVID-19 pandemic in California